The American Jugoslav Association of Minnesota (AJAM) is a US migrant fraternal association founded in 1924 in Eveleth, Minnesota, largely by Croatian and Slovene immigrants. Approximately 1,500 delegates attended the founding session in September 1924. John Malera of Eveleth and John Movern of Duluth, Minnesota were elected the first president and secretary. Conventions have been held annually at least until 1949.  The statutes declared objectives such as to unite all Yugoslavs in Minnesota, to inspire them to attend night schools, to urge and assist them to become US citizens, to awaken their love for the US and to “protect its members from exploitation in the economic and political field”.

References

Croatian-American history
Slovene-American culture in Minnesota
Organizations based in Minnesota
Ethnic fraternal orders in the United States
Organizations established in 1924
Yugoslav American